Intrépide was a 74-gun third-rate ship of the line of the French navy. She was originally built at Ferrol, Spain in 1790 by José Romero y Fernández de Landa as the Spanish ship of the line Intrepido, one of the ten ships of the San Ildefonso Class, but was transferred to the French Navy in 1801 in accordance with the Second Treaty of San Ildefonso signed in 1800.

On 21 October 1805, Intrépide was one of the ships of Rear-Admiral Pierre Dumanoir le Pelley at the Battle of Trafalgar, under Captain Louis-Antoine Infernet.

Nelson's attacks left these ships downwind of the main confrontation and Dumanoir did not immediately obey Villeneuve's orders to return to the battle. When the ships did turn back, most of them only exchanged a few shots before retiring.

Infernet and his crew, wanting to join the fight, eventually disobeyed Dumanoir's orders and joined the battle, followed by the Spanish 80-gun  (Captain Cayetano de Valdés).

See also
 List of ships captured in the 19th century

References

Ships of the line of the French Navy
Ships built in Spain
Shipwrecks of Spain
1799 ships
Captured ships
Napoleonic-era ships
Maritime incidents in 1805